Darwin Deason (born 1940) is an American billionaire businessman and political donor. He founded Affiliated Computer Services in 1988, and sold it to Xerox for $6.4 billion in 2010, becoming Xerox' largest individual shareholder (6%, as of 2016).

Career
Deason grew up on a farm near Rogers, Arkansas. He moved to Tulsa, Oklahoma after graduating from high school, and he got a job at Gulf Oil. Deason got a job for a data processing company, and eventually took control of a struggling Dallas company that he renamed MTech. After selling MTech, Deason founded Affiliated Computer Services in 1988. ACS became one of the first companies to outsource office work to places outside of the United States. The company went public in 1994. Deason retired as CEO of the company in 1999, but remained chairman.

In 2007, Deason attempted to buy control of ACS with the help of Cerberus Capital Management, but the deal collapsed and members of the A.C.S. board resigned in protest. In 2009, Deason negotiated a deal to sell A.C.S. to Xerox. Shareholders sued Deason due to the premium that Deason received in the deal, but the sale went through in 2010.

In October 2016, Darwin Deason sued Xerox to block a restructuring plan that would reverse the $6.2 billion takeover of ACS, arguing the deal would lead his assets to live off low-growth, unattractive assets, whereas his deal with Xerox implied getting a share of Xerox' investment-grade business. Xerox has announced its plan to split its operations into copier and printers on one end, and business process outsourcing on the other (to become Conduent Inc). By the end of October 2016, the feud was settled: Darwin Deason got 180,000 shares of Xerox's preferred stock and 120,000 preferred shares of Conduent.

Political activity
Deason and his family donated $250,000 to support Rick Perry's 2012 presidential candidacy.

In October 2015, Darwin Deason backed Ted Cruz for the 2016 campaign

Deason also donated $5 million to support Perry's 2016 presidential candidacy. After Perry dropped out of the race, Deason asked for his money back. Deason's son, Doug Deason is a member of the Koch Brothers political network.

During the 2017 attempt to repeal the Affordable Care Act, Doug Deason told Senator Mitch McConnell and other senior Republicans that they would not make political contributions if Congress did not reduce taxes and repeal the Affordable Care Act.

Between 2017 and June 30, 2019, Deason donated $1 million to the America First Policies-tied America First Action super PAC.

References

Living people
1940 births
American billionaires
People from Rogers, Arkansas
Businesspeople from Dallas
Texas Republicans